RCAF Station Bowden was a Second World War British Commonwealth Air Training Plan (BCATP) station located near Bowden, Alberta, Canada. It was operated and administered by the Royal Canadian Air Force (RCAF).

History

World War II
RCAF Station Bowden was constructed as a component of the British Commonwealth Air Training Plan near the community of Bowden, Alberta. It was originally opened by the Royal Air Force, as an elementary flying training school (No. 32 EFTS) on 12 July 1941. The Station had over 100 students at the time. On 20 July 1942 it was taken over by the Edmonton Flying Club. Eventually, it had over 240 students and over 150 aircraft on strength. The aircraft used were initially Tiger Moths and later Cornells. Stearman aircraft were also used. RCAF Station Bowden was closed on 8 September 1944.

Aerodrome

Relief landing field – Netook
The primary Relief Landing Field (R1) for RCAF Station Bowden was located approximately halfway between Bowden and Olds, Alberta. The relief field is now being operated as Olds (Netook) Airport.

Present Day
The aerodrome is now completely removed and the site is now the location of the Bowden Institution

References

Bowden
Buildings and structures in Alberta
Military airbases in Alberta
Military history of Alberta
1941 establishments in Alberta